Robert Walker was an English footballer. His regular position was at full back. He played for Newton Heath during the 1898-99 season.

External links
MUFCInfo.com profile

English footballers
Manchester United F.C. players
Association football fullbacks
Year of death missing
Year of birth missing